The 2012–13 Russian Professional Basketball League (PBL) was the third and last season of the Russian Professional League, and the 22nd overall season of the Russian Professional Championship. The season started on 3 October 2012 and ended 12 May 2013.

Unification with VTB United League
In May 2012, all the PBL clubs gathered to decide which format would be used for the next season, and some of the club's directors raised the possibility of uniting with the VTB United League, in order to produce greater competition between the Russian basketball clubs. They suggested that the new league would be named the Eastern European Professional Basketball League.

In July 2012, the Council of VTB United League gave a definitive decision. It was decided that the PBL league would continue for one more year, with some of the games of the VTB United League that took place between two Russian clubs being counted as PBL games. The first tier Russian clubs then replaced the PBL with the VTB United League as their new national domestic league championship, starting with the 2013–14 season.

Format 
There were no league playoffs during this season. The team that finished first in the regular season standings was declared the league's champions. All teams met each other at home and away venues. In the regular season, each team played 18 games.

Teams

Regular season

See also
2012–13 VTB United League

References

External links
 Professional Basketball League

Russian Professional Basketball League
Russian 2012
Russia